Saint-Julien-de-Crempse ( or Sent Júlian de Cremsa) is a former commune in the Dordogne department in Nouvelle-Aquitaine in southwestern France. On 1 January 2019, it was merged into the new commune Eyraud-Crempse-Maurens.

History
During World War II the surrounding countryside may have been home to as many as 60 separate cells of the French Resistance. Saint-Julien was a hiding place for Resistance fighters, and one Maquis leader had his base in the village. On 9 August 1944, 17 villagers from Saint-Julien were executed by the Germans as reprisal for Resistance activities in the area. On 10 September 1944, 17 German prisoners of war were collected by French Resistance members and executed near Saint-Julien as a revenge killing.

Population

See also
Communes of the Dordogne department

References

Former communes of Dordogne